NQY, or nqy, may refer to:

NQY, the IATA code for Newquay Airport, the main commercial airport for Cornwall, England
nqy, the ISO 639-3 code for the Akyaung Ari language
NQY, the National Rail code for Newquay railway station, Cornwall, England

See also